Artur Albertovich Gubaydullin (in other sources - Gubaydulin/Губайдулин; born 27 September 1988) is a former Russian professional football player.

Club career
He played in the Russian Football National League for FC Sodovik Sterlitamak in 2007.

External links
 
 

1988 births
People from Sterlitamak
Living people
Russian footballers
Association football midfielders
FC Sodovik Sterlitamak players
FC Dynamo Vologda players
FC Bashinformsvyaz-Dynamo Ufa players
FC Sakhalin Yuzhno-Sakhalinsk players
FC Irtysh Omsk players
FC Nosta Novotroitsk players
Sportspeople from Bashkortostan